Brigitte Leutenegger is a former Swiss curler.

At the national level, she is a Swiss women's champion curler (1990) and a two-time Swiss mixed champion curler (1982, 1991).

Teams

Women's

Mixed

References

External links
 

Living people
Swiss female curlers
Swiss curling champions
Year of birth missing (living people)